The Inland Northwest Vietnam Veterans Memorial in Spokane, Washington was designed by Deborah Copenhaver Fellows.
The memorial is a bronze statue of a male soldier holding a letter. The bronze part weighs , and the granite base weighs . The artist's commission was $95,000, raised through local donations after Portland, Oregon made a bid to buy the statue. It was created in 1984, and dedicated on November 11, 1985, after installation in Riverfront Park.

References

1985 establishments in Washington (state)
Bronze sculptures in Washington (state)
Monuments and memorials in Washington (state)
Outdoor sculptures in Washington (state)
Vietnam War monuments and memorials in the United States
Statues in Washington (state)